Amphonyx lucifer is a moth of the family Sphingidae first described by Walter Rothschild and Karl Jordan in 1903.

Distribution 
It is found in tropical and subtropical lowlands from Mexico, Belize, Guatemala, Nicaragua and Costa Rica, south through Venezuela to Brazil, Bolivia, Argentina and Ecuador.

Description 
The wingspan is 140–160 mm.

Biology 
Adults are on wing year round. They nectar at flowers.

The larvae feed on Annona purpurea and Desmopsis schippii and probably other Annonaceae species. They are clear green and white or blue-green. The prepupa is green with a rose stripe down its back.

References

Amphonyx
Moths described in 1903
Taxa named by Walter Rothschild
Taxa named by Karl Jordan
Moths of North America
Moths of South America